Phanagnathus overlaeti was a species of beetle in the family Carabidae, the only species in the genus Phanagnathus. It is now considered a synonym of Notiobia overlaeti (Burgeon, 1936).

References

Harpalinae
Monotypic Carabidae genera